The Cinematic Symphony (formerly known as the Austin Wind Symphony) is a musical ensemble based in Austin, Texas. The group is composed of volunteers and is dedicated to preserving and performing the music of film and television.

Overview
The group was founded on June 7, 2005, by its original conductor, Patrick Phillips.  The 50+-piece volunteer ensemble was assembled in an effort to create a stronger awareness of and appreciation for Film and Television scoring and its composers.  The name was changed in 2010 to "Cinematic Symphony" to more accurately reflect the full orchestra's classification and purpose. In addition to performing four to six concerts annually, the ensemble has also recorded numerous film scores. All concerts are free to the public, include very educational trivia questions and prizes, and costumes are always welcome.

Celebrity endorsements

Many celebrities have also endorsed the ensemble with support including:

George Takei (Mr. Sulu) Star Trek
David Arquette Eight Legged Freaks
Bill Clinton Former POTUS
Burton Gilliam Blazing Saddles
Candyce McClure Battlestar Galactica
Harry Manfredini (composer) Friday the 13th
Tony Todd Candyman
Trailer voice-over legend Don LaFontaine even recorded the Austin Wind Symphony's tag lines for promotional use.

Concerts

The Cinematic Symphony performs "themed" concerts 4-6 times a year. Some of our most memorable concerts include the following:

05/06/17 – Saturday Morning Superheroes: Some of the best DC Comics scores from composers Dynamic Music Partners, who were in attendance.

03/15/17 – In the Key of Giacchino: Celebrating multi-Grammy- and Academy Award-winning American composer Michael Giacchino

05/11/16 – Danny Elfmania!

03/05/16 – Horner Homage: A loving tribute to the late Academy Award-winning composer James Horner.

12/12/15 – Star Wars: The Music Awakens03/07/15 – Star Trek!03/15/14 – Super Heroes Under the Dome: Music of your favorite super heroes performed live under the dome of the State Capitol building in Austin, TX! Includes a world premiere performance of Justice League.05/04/13 – Star Wars: Cinematic Symphony in Concert: Two conductors conduct the timeless music of John Williams from all six Star Wars episode movies. Free Concert. May the 4th be with you!03/02/13 – Disney Through the Ages: Music spanning seven decades of Walt Disney movies.12/15/12 – Good Guys vs Bad Guys: Your favorite underdogs and villains go head to head in a thrilling live performance featuring music from "Catch Me if You Can," “The Godfather,” “On the Waterfront," "James Bond," and more.10/28/12 – Scores of Scares: It was a creepy “Night on the Bare Mountain” when that “Psycho” “Harry Potter” grabbed a bottle of “Beetlejuice” in his “Jaws” and told me about the night he and “Young Frankenstein” took some “Gremlins” to see “The Dance of the Witches.” I'll never forget “The Day the Earth Stood Still” because I knew it would never scare me as much as “Ed Wood.”02/24/12 – From the Vault: Concert announcing permanent conductor Jesus Torres. Hosted by film composer Brian Satterwhite.11/11/11 – Salute to Valor: Cinematic War Themes: Hosted by Jim Kipping, the voice of Netflix and Geraldo at Large, this Veteran's Day concert included movie music from The Patriot, Gettysburg, March from 1941, Wind and the Lion, and more. A Color Guard performed, and there was a moving reading of the Sullivan Ballou letter featuring violin soloist Alden Doyle. All the military branches were recognized during the piece Armed Forces Salute which featured many military personnel.03/23/10 – The Music of Video Games: This concert included all the video game favorites including Gerard Marino's epic orchestral score for Sony Computer Entertainment's God of War plus a trombone-only tribute to Tetris.03/26/09 – Hollywood's Greatest Film Themes: Not only did this concert include the most popular films of all time, but it also included a national food drive inspired by the upcoming film “The Soloist.”10/24/08 – Star Trek: the Symphonic Frontier: Star Trek pieces ranging from the original series to all the latest movies. This included a beautiful arrangement of “The Inner Light Theme” for the Ressikan flute from “The Next Generation” series and let to an encore performance in May 2009 at the Bob Bullock Texas History Museum.03/25/08 – Pigeon Impossible: This was a scoring session for an animated film by Lucas Martell.03/07/08 – The Music of Video Games: This concert was performed to a sold-out crowd of gaming and gaming music fans. Gaming character actors also got involved.12/31/07 – First Night Austin: These movie and television favorites were performed in City Hall on New Year's Eve.10/19/07 – Creature Features: This concert was hosted by Professor Griffin (Joseph Fotinos) of Fangoria TV. Orchestra members and audience were all in costume!07/20/07 – Harry Potter: This Harry Potter tribute was performed to a crowd of over 4,000 for the book premier "Harry Potter and the Deathly Hallows."05/11/07 – Music of the Wild West: This concert of western favorites was hosted by Burton Gilliam of "Blazing Saddles" fame who actually sang and danced during the concert. Even the orchestra wore western attire.02/16/07 – The Epics: This epic performance was hosted by Jim Kipping, the voice of Netflix and Geraldo at Large. It featured movie and television epics as well as a vocal soloist.12/01/06 – Christmas on Broadway!: This holiday gift was held at Highland Mall in north Austin with an audience of hundreds.10/13/06 – Halloween Spooktacular!: This concert featured a tribute to Star Trek's 40th Anniversary with a video thanks to the Austin Wind Symphony by special guest celebrity, George Takei (sulu). The orchestra was in costume. Special guest performer was theremin player Robert Froehner.08/04/06 – The Music of John Williams: This John Williams tribute was hosted by Shelli Coe, daughter of famed country artist David Allen Coe.05/12/06 – Texas Music Festival: Movie Milestones Encore10/15/05 – Music of Heroes & Villains:''' Featuring the best music of everyone's favorite hero movies and TV shows. Special guest performer was theremin player Robert Froehner.

External links 

Music organizations based in the United States
Organizations based in Austin, Texas